Nicholas Polly (born Nicholas Joseph Polachanin) (April 18, 1917 in Chicago – January 17, 1993), was a professional baseball player who played third base in the Major Leagues for the 1937 Brooklyn Dodgers and 1945 Boston Red Sox.

External links

1917 births
1993 deaths
Brooklyn Dodgers players
Boston Red Sox players
Major League Baseball third basemen
Baseball players from Illinois
Davenport Blue Sox players
Dayton Ducks players
Elmira Colonels players
Oklahoma City Indians players
Fort Worth Cats players
Dallas Steers players
Columbia Reds players
Birmingham Barons players
Louisville Colonels (minor league) players
Toledo Mud Hens players